Farewell to the Sea is a 1987 book and the third in Cuban author Reinaldo Arenas' Pentagonia book series, which critics have often argued as his best.

Set on a Cuban beach immediately following the revolution, a disenchanted poet mourns for the new suppression while his wife longs for the connectivity that she can no longer find.

References

1987 American novels
Pentagonia novels
Hispanic and Latino American novels
Novels set in Cuba
Novels about writers
Gay male literature